Leptomyrina handmani is a butterfly in the family Lycaenidae. It is found in southern Malawi and Zambia.

The larvae feed on Kalanchoe and Cotyledon species.

References

Butterflies described in 1965
Hypolycaenini
Lepidoptera of Malawi
Lepidoptera of Zambia